The 2020 San Francisco Board of Supervisors elections were held on November 3, 2020 though many voted early by mail  due to the COVID-19 pandemic in the United States. Six of the eleven seats on the San Francisco Board of Supervisors were contested. One incumbent was termed out of office, another incumbent chose to retire, and four ran for reelection. The election was conducted with ranked-choice voting.

Results

District 1 
Incumbent Supervisor Sandra Lee Fewer was eligible to stand for reelection but decided against it, citing a desire to focus on personal matters.

District 3 
Incumbent Supervisor Aaron Peskin was eligible for reelection.

District 5 
Incumbent Supervisor Dean Preston was eligible to run for reelection. The 2020 election was a rematch of the prior year's special election, with former Supervisor Vallie Brown aiming to win back her seat after narrowly losing by 0.8%.

District 7 
Incumbent Supervisor Norman Yee was ineligible to run due to term limits.

District 9 
Incumbent Supervisor Hillary Ronen was eligible to run for reelection. She ran unopposed.

District 11 
Incumbent Supervisor Ahsha Safaí was eligible for reelection. The race was notable as Safaí's primary opponent was former Supervisor and 2011 San Francisco mayoral candidate John Avalos. San Francisco law states that Supervisors may serve a maximum of two continuous terms, meaning Avalos, out of office since 2017, was eligible to run for another two terms.

References 

San Francisco Board of Supervisors
San Francisco Board of Supervisors
Board of Supervisors 2020
2020 in San Francisco